Alvin and the Chipmunks: The Road Chip is a 2015 American live-action/computer-animated jukebox musical comedy film directed by Walt Becker and written by Randi Mayem Singer and Adam Sztykiel. It is the fourth and final installment in the Alvin and the Chipmunks live-action film series and a sequel to the 2011 film Alvin and the Chipmunks: Chipwrecked. The film's main cast features Jason Lee, Tony Hale, Kimberly Williams-Paisley and Josh Green. Justin Long, Matthew Gray Gubler and Jesse McCartney all reprise their roles as the Chipmunks, while Kaley Cuoco, Anna Faris and Christina Applegate play the Chipettes. Cuoco replaced Amy Poehler as the voice of Eleanor in the film.

The film centers on the Chipmunks (Alvin, Simon, and Theodore) as they head to Miami after believing that Dave will propose to his girlfriend Samantha, who has a son who bullies the Chipmunks. Along the way they end up in unfortunate circumstances, such as being put on the No Fly List.

The film was released on December 18, 2015, by 20th Century Fox. The film grossed $234 million worldwide against a $90 million budget and received generally negative reviews from critics, although it was considered a slight improvement over its predecessor.

Plot

Alvin, Simon, and Theodore, along with the Chipettes – Brittany, Jeanette, and Eleanor – have moved to a new house and set up a surprise birthday bash for Dave Seville that also serves as a good luck/going-away party for the Chipettes, who are scheduled to be guest judges on American Idol. Alvin invites and hires many people and celebrities, much to Simon's dismay. Though dissatisfied, Dave agrees to take them mini-golfing, where the Chipmunks meet Samantha, who he has been dating for the past few months. While the Chipmunks like Samantha, her son Miles physically abuses the trio. Later, the Chipmunks find an engagement ring in a bag Dave brought home and believe that he is going to propose to Samantha. Realizing in horror that Dave and Samantha getting married would make Miles their step-brother, they try to steal the ring, but are unsuccessful.

Dave has to produce a record for rising pop artist Ashley Grey in Miami, and decides to bring Samantha along with him. The Chipmunks and Miles are staying together, but they agree to head to Miami to sabotage the supposed proposal. The Chipmunks drug three squirrels and dress them up in their clothes to fool their hard-of-seeing neighbor Ms. Price, who was asked to look after them. The Chipmunks travel on a plane, but Theodore lets out a monkey, which then lets out several animals, leading to an emergency landing and frustrates unscrupulous Air Marshal James Suggs, who is revealed to resent the Chipmunks because his girlfriend dumped him on Christmas for being obsessed with them at the time, effectively eliminating his shot of becoming an FBI agent, so he puts them on the No Fly List (except for Miles).

The Chipmunks perform at a bar, but are caught by Suggs. Alvin starts a bar fight, and the Chipmunks escape. They jump into a taxi cab, but the driver ejects them for not having money. The Chipmunks and Miles rest at an old tree, and he reveals that his father left him when he was five years old, causing the four to bond and see each other in different lights. They raise money to take a bus to New Orleans, and perform at the Mardi Gras parade, which draws the attention of Dave when it is broadcast on live television and allows the Chipmunks to cause Suggs, who has followed them, to get drunk on moonshine.

Dave and Samantha find Miles and the Chipmunks at Louis Armstrong New Orleans International Airport and punish them for sneaking out and not responding to numerous missed calls and texts from Dave. With the Chipmunks now on the No Fly List, Dave has to drive them. When they arrive in Miami, Alvin reveals that he stole the ring from the container, thus sabotaging the proposal. However, Miles had bonded with the Chipmunks during their trip and was upset that they were celebrating over this, thinking they just didn't want to have him around. He crosses the street with his headphones on and is nearly hit by a car, but the Chipmunks swing Theodore and push Miles out of the way, saving his life. They agree to give the ring back.

During the dinner, Suggs catches up with the Chipmunks, but they trap him in an elevator. Miles and the Chipmunks return the ring to Dave, saying that they accept Samantha and Miles into the family, but Dave reveals the ring once belonged to his friend Barry, who was proposing to his girlfriend, Alice. As one final attempt, they try making it up to him by singing a new song to him at the launch party with the help of the Chipettes, Ashley and Miles. They also return the ring to Barry, who reattempts his proposal to Alice, and this time, Alice accepts. Having forgiven them, Dave officially adopts the Chipmunks as his sons. As soon as Dave and the boys arrive home they find out the squirrels Alvin planted there earlier destroyed the house and Dave yells his famous ALVIN! catchphrase.

Cast

Live-action cast
 Jason Lee as David "Dave" Seville, a music producer and the adoptive father of the Chipmunks and the Chipettes. 
 Tony Hale as Agent James Suggs, an unscrupulous air marshal who personally despises the Chipmunks because they ruined a former relationship between him and his girlfriend, and as a result, he puts them on the No Fly List for revenge.
 Kimberly Williams-Paisley as Samantha, Dave's girlfriend and the woman he's been dating for the past few months. 
 Josh Green as Miles, Samantha's son who was initially mean to the Chipmunks, but later becomes their friend and probably has a one-sided love for Ashley.
 Bella Thorne as Ashley Grey, a pop singer whom Dave has to produce a record to in Miami.
 Uzo Aduba as TSA Officer
 Flula Borg as Man Behind the Mask
 Retta as The Event Planner 
 Eddie Steeples as Barry

Voice cast
 Justin Long as Alvin Seville, a brave and musical but mischievous chipmunk who is the leader of the Chipmunks.
 Ross Bagdasarian Jr. provides Alvin's singing voice. 
 Matthew Gray Gubler as Simon Seville, an intelligent chipmunk who is the tallest of the three and a member of the Chipmunks.
 Steve Vining provides Simon's singing voice.
 Jesse McCartney as Theodore Seville, a timid chipmunk who is the smallest of the three and a member of the Chipmunks.
 Janice Karman provides Theodore's singing voice.
 Kaley Cuoco as Eleanor, a female chipmunk who is the smallest of the three, and the member of the Chipettes. (Cuoco replaces Amy Poehler as the voice of Eleanor).
 Janice Karman provides Eleanor's singing voice.
 Anna Faris as Jeanette, a female chipmunk who is the tallest of the three, and the member of the Chipettes.
 Janice Karman provides Jeanette's singing voice.
 Christina Applegate as Brittany, a fearless, determined, and independent chipmunk who is the leader of the Chipettes and is occasionally arguing with Alvin.
 Janice Karman provides Brittany's singing voice.
Additionally, Maxie McClintock appears as Alice, Mark Jeffrey Miller appears as Cab Driver, Redfoo (cameo) appears as himself, John Waters (cameo) appears as John, Jennifer Coolidge (cameo) appears as Ms. Price, Laura Marano (cameo) appears as Hotel Babysitter, and Zeeko Zaki appears as Paparazzo.

Production
In June 2013, 20th Century Fox announced that a fourth installment, Alvin and the Chipmunks 4, would be released on December 11, 2015. In August 2014, Randi Mayem Singer signed on to write the fourth installment. On December 18, 2014, it was announced that Walt Becker signed on to direct and that the film would be released on December 23, 2015. The movie was officially released on December 18, 2015. It was also announced that the film would be titled Alvin and the Chipmunks: The Road Chip. In February 2015, Tony Hale joined the cast. On March 10, 2015, Kimberly Williams-Paisley joined the cast. On March 23, 2015, it was confirmed that Bella Thorne had joined the cast. Principal photography began on March 16, 2015, and ended on May 20, 2015.

Music
Mark Mothersbaugh, who previously scored Alvin and the Chipmunks: Chipwrecked, returned to score The Road Chip.

Home media
Alvin and the Chipmunks: The Road Chip was released on DVD and Blu-ray on March 15, 2016.

Soundtrack

Alvin and the Chipmunks: The Road Chip: Original Motion Picture Soundtrack is the licensed soundtrack based on the film. It was released on December 11, 2015, by Republic Records.

Reception

Box office
Alvin and the Chipmunks: The Road Chip has grossed $85,886,987 in North America and $148,911,649 in other territories for a worldwide total of $234,798,636 against a budget of $90 million.

In the United States and Canada, The Road Chip was released on December 18, 2015, across 3,653 theaters. The film grossed $4,126,717 on its first day and $14,287,159 in its opening weekend, finishing second at the box office behind Star Wars: The Force Awakens ($247,966,675).

Critical response
On Rotten Tomatoes, the film has an approval rating of 15% based on 67 reviews and an average rating of 3.42/10. The site's critical consensus reads, "In some respects, Alvin and the Chipmunks: The Road Chip is a marginal improvement over prior installments, although this in no way qualifies as a recommendation." On Metacritic, the film has a score of 33 out of 100 based on 21 critics, indicating "generally unfavorable reviews". Audiences polled by CinemaScore gave the film an average grade of "A−" on an A+ to F scale.

Accolades

References

External links

  
 
 Alvin and the Chipmunks: The Road Chip at the TCM Movie Database
 

Alvin and the Chipmunks films
2015 films
American films with live action and animation
2010s English-language films
2010s adventure comedy films
2010s musical comedy films
2010s comedy road movies
20th Century Fox films
TSG Entertainment films
American adventure comedy films
American children's animated comedy films
American fantasy films
American musical comedy films
American comedy road movies
American sequel films
Films scored by Mark Mothersbaugh
Films directed by Walt Becker
Live-action films based on animated series
Films set in Miami
Films set in New Orleans
Films shot in Florida
Films set in Los Angeles
Regency Enterprises films
2015 comedy films
Films about vacationing
Films produced by Ross Bagdasarian Jr.
Films produced by Janice Karman
Golden Raspberry Award winning films
Jukebox musical films
2010s American films